Terrence Corke (born 27 December 1955) is a Jamaican cricketer. He played in five first-class and four List A matches for the Jamaican cricket team from 1983 to 1985.

See also
 List of Jamaican representative cricketers

References

External links
 

1955 births
Living people
Jamaican cricketers
Jamaica cricketers
Sportspeople from Kingston, Jamaica